The Hiccles Cove Formation is a Mesozoic geologic formation in Canada. Plesiosaur remains are among the fossils that have been recovered from its strata.

See also

 Plesiosaur stratigraphic distribution

Mesozoic Erathem of North America